Heligmomerus is a genus of armored trapdoor spiders that was first described by Eugène Louis Simon in 1892.

Species
As of August 2022, it contains fourteen species, mostly from Africa, and seven from India:
Heligmomerus astutus (Hewitt, 1915) – Zimbabwe
Heligmomerus barkudensis (Gravely, 1921) – India
Heligmomerus biharicus (Gravely, 1915) – India
Heligmomerus caffer Purcell, 1903 – South Africa
Heligmomerus carsoni Pocock, 1897 – Tanzania
Heligmomerus deserti Pocock, 1901 – Botswana
Heligmomerus garoensis (Tikader, 1977) – India
Heligmomerus jagadishchandra Das, Pratihar, Khatun & Diksha, 2022 – India
Heligmomerus jeanneli Berland, 1914 – East Africa
Heligmomerus maximus Sanap & Mirza, 2015 – India
Heligmomerus prostans Simon, 1892 – India
Heligmomerus somalicus Pocock, 1896 – Somalia
Heligmomerus taprobanicus Simon, 1892 (type) – Sri Lanka
Heligmomerus wii Siliwal, Hippargi, Yadav & Kumar, 2020 – India

See also
 List of Idiopidae species

References

External links

Idiopidae
Mygalomorphae genera
Spiders of Africa
Spiders of the Indian subcontinent